Rising in the East is a live DVD of Judas Priest, released on 15 November 2005, performing a concert in Tokyo's Nippon Budokan, filmed on 19 May 2005. It is the first straight-to-DVD release.

Release 
In unconfirmed internet reports, the DVD was to be pushed back to January 2006 while other online retailers still listed its release for 15 November 2005. In addition, two different cover arts had surfaced with former website Play.com displaying a cover art unlike one displayed on Amazon.

Information 
The band filmed two sold-out performances on 18 & 19 May 2005 in Tokyo in which the latter footage was used instead. Glenn Tipton explains that the band decided to film their performances at the Budokan "because it's a special venue. It's world-renowned. We thought it was an ideal choice. We filmed both nights but we ended up using the second night only for this DVD. We wanted it to be as live and as real as possible, and when you start taking from different shows there isn't continuity. We wanted it to be one show and that's exactly what it is." Rob Halford says that the display of Rising in the East to the fans "is the first time seeing us reunited for a full-length show in the DVD format. I think the DVD compounds all the great things that Priest fans and metal fans all around the world love about the band. Priest is still a powerful, physical, full-on experience in the live domain. What this DVD is intended to do is give longtime Priest fans another great memory to add to their collection, and it's also an opportunity for new Priest fans to explore all the great things we're achieving three decades later."

Track listing

Encores

Personnel
Rob Halford – vocals
K.K. Downing – electric guitar
Glenn Tipton – guitar
Ian Hill – bass guitar
Scott Travis – drums

Sales and certifications

|-

References

External links
[ Rising in the East] at Allmusic

Judas Priest video albums
2005 video albums
Live video albums
2005 live albums